Egling station is a railway station in the municipality of Egling an der Paar, in Bavaria, Germany. It is located on the Mering–Weilheim line of Deutsche Bahn.

Services
 the following services stop at Egling:

References

External links
 
 Egling layout 
 

Railway stations in Bavaria
Buildings and structures in Landsberg (district)